Nepalgunj Medical College Teaching Hospital (NGMC) is a major healthcare facility with a 750-bed teaching hospital at Kohalpur and a 250-bed hospital at Nepalgunj, Nepal established in 1996. It provides cath lab facilities for heart patients.  The college started the MBBS course in 1997, Nursing program in 2000, and Postgraduate MD/MS in 2007.

See also
Kathmandu University
Nepal Medical Council
Tribhuvan University

References

External links
 College website

Medical colleges in Nepal
Educational institutions established in 1996
Organisations associated with Kathmandu University
1996 establishments in Nepal